The Alliance for Direct Democracy in Europe, abbreviated to ADDE, was a European political party founded in 2014. It was composed of parties belonging to the Europe of Freedom and Direct Democracy (EFDD) group in the European Parliament (EP). The dominant national party in the ADDE was the UK Independence Party (UKIP), providing 21 of the party's 27 members of the European Parliament (MEPs) elected in 2014. A further three UKIP MEPs chose not to participate in the ADDE. In 2015 the ADDE was recognised by the European Parliament and its grant maximum from the EP was set at €1,241,725, with an additional €730,053 for its affiliated political foundation, the Initiative for Direct Democracy. ADDE was closed down in 2016 after an auditors' inquiry found misspending of EU funds. The party was legally dissolved on 24 May 2017.

Member parties

Notes

Eurosceptic parties
Pan-European political parties
2014 establishments in the European Union
Political parties established in 2014
Right-wing populism in Europe